Kadoorat (English: Hate) is a 2013 Pakistani mystery drama television series produced by Momina Duraid. Kadoorat is written by Zoha Hassan and directed by Aabis Raza. Kadoorat premiered on Hum TV on 17 July 2013.

Synopsis

Kadurat is the story of a girl, Minah (Sanam Saeed), whose mother dies in a car accident when she is eight. Her father remarries to Atiqa (Angeline Malik) who is already a mother of two, so that she can take care of his child along with her two children. But Minah cannot accept them as her new family, so she creates problems for her step family owing to which, Minah's father sends her off to a hostel. She is heartbroken and takes her father with a vengeance. After some years when Minah returns home after completing her education, she tries everything she can to deliberately create problems for her family. She takes help from Shaheen (Nida Khan), who is her friend but secretly envies Minah for her money. With Shaheen's help, she jeopardizes the lives of everyone around her, only to be fooled and trapped by Shaheen in return which opens her eyes as her family stands by her. She seeks forgiveness from her family and in the end puts everything right that was done wrong by her and Shaheen.

Cast 
 Sanam Saeed as Minah
 Zhalay Sarhadi as Minah's Mom
 Deepak Perwani as Mahmud
 Imran Aslam as Asad
 Momal Sheikh as Alina
 Angeline Malik as Atiqa
 Junaid Khan as Daniyal
 Hira Pervaiz as Aasma
 Nida Khan as Shaheen
 Sohail Hashmi as Daniyal's father
 Seemi Pasha as Daniyal's mother
 Adnan Jaffar as Dr.Zohaib
 Muneeb Butt as Adnan

Broadcast and release 
The show was broadcast in India on Zindagi from 27 March 2015 Monday – Saturday 10:00 pm under the title Ranjish. It ended its run on 1 May 2015. It was aired on MBC Drama in Arab world under the title مرآة ذات وجهين. It was released on MX Player app to stream online.

References 

Hum TV original programming
2013 Pakistani television series debuts
Pakistani drama television series
Urdu-language television shows
Mystery television series
Zee Zindagi original programming